Ludolph of Ratzeburg was a Premonstratensian Bishop of Ratzeburg.

Religious life
In 1236, Ludolph was appointed to the see of the newly formed Prince-Bishopric of Ratzeburg. Ludolph came into conflict with Duke Albert I of Saxony and was duly imprisoned, where he was badly beaten, and later sent into exile. In exile Ludolph was taken in by Duke John of Mecklenburg, but died soon after in 1250 because of the abuse he received in prison.

Legacy
One legend tells of a soldier who was wounded when an arrowhead was embedded in his head. The soldier, who was in great pain, invoked the intercession of St. Ludolph, and he was soon able to remove the arrow and was healed.

References

German Roman Catholic saints
13th-century Christian saints
1250 deaths
13th-century German Roman Catholic bishops
Premonstratensians
Roman Catholic Prince-Bishops of Ratzeburg
Year of birth unknown